Brian Desmond Pfaff  (2 March 1930 – 8 May 1998) was a South African rugby union player and first-class cricketer.

Rugby union career
Pfaff was born in Durban and attended Hilton College. At school he won colours for many sports, including rugby union and boxing.  After school he went to the University of Cape Town to study accounting and played rugby and cricket for Western Province.

He toured with the Springboks to Australia and New Zealand in 1956. His first and only test match was against  at the Sydney Cricket Ground. On the New Zealand leg of the tour he played in three matches. Later in 1956 he captained the South African Universities rugby side on their tour of Europe.

Test history

Cricket career
Pfaff played first-class cricket for Western Province, making his debut during the 1952/53 season. He played in all six matches when Western Province won the Currie Cup in 1952/53. Pfaff scored 941 runs in his eighteen matches at an average of 33.60, with a high score of 78.

See also
List of South Africa national rugby union players – Springbok no. 331

References

External links

1930 births
1998 deaths
South African rugby union players
South Africa international rugby union players
Western Province cricketers
Alumni of Hilton College (South Africa)
University of Cape Town alumni
Rugby union players from Durban
Rugby union centres
Western Province (rugby union) players